The Lands Tribunal for Northern Ireland is a court of record in Northern Ireland established by the Lands Tribunal and Compensation Act (Northern Ireland) 1964.

Courts of Northern Ireland
1964 establishments in Northern Ireland
Courts and tribunals established in 1964